James Sharp (1894 – 26 April 1915) was a Scottish professional footballer who played as a left back in the Scottish League for Falkirk.

Personal life 
Soon after the outbreak of the First World War in August 1914, Sharp enlisted as a private in the Argyll and Sutherland Highlanders. He was serving in the 7th Battalion when he was killed in Flanders on 26 April 1915. Sharp is commemorated on the Menin Gate.

Honours 
Falkirk

 Stirlingshire Consolation Cup: 1912–13

References 

Scottish footballers
1915 deaths
British Army personnel of World War I
British military personnel killed in World War I
1894 births
Argyll and Sutherland Highlanders soldiers
Falkirk F.C. players
Association football fullbacks
People from Denny, Falkirk